USS Dobbin (AD-3) is the name of a United States Navy destroyer tender of World War II, named after James Cochrane Dobbin, the Secretary of the Navy from 1853 to 1857.

Dobbin was launched on 5 May 1921 by the Philadelphia Navy Yard. She was commissioned on 23 July 1924, and served for 22 years before being decommissioned on 27 September 1946, and transferred to the United States Maritime Commission for disposal.

Pre-World War II
Dobbin (AD-3) was launched on 5 May 1921 at the Philadelphia Navy Yard, sponsored by Mrs. H. H. James, granddaughter of Secretary Dobbin.  She was commissioned on 23 July 1924.

On 3 January 1925 Dobbin sailed for Guantanamo Bay, Cuba, by way of Newport, Rhode Island, and Hampton Roads, Virginia, where she loaded equipment and supplies for her mission as tender to Destroyer Squadron 14 of the Scouting Fleet.  She joined that squadron at Guantanamo Bay, and took part in gunnery practice with the destroyers. From this base, on 13 February 1925, Dobbin steamed to the Panama Canal and crossed to the Pacific Ocean. After maneuvers at sea with the Scouting Fleet she arrived at San Diego on 9 March 1925 for four months of tender service along the west coast and at Pearl Harbor, Hawaii.

Dobbin returned to the east coast in July 1925 and operated in the Atlantic Ocean for the next seven years. During this time she participated in radio experiments and continued her services to the destroyers of the Scouting Fleet. In 1932, Dobbin returned to San Diego, arriving 1 September, and operated out of that port until 5 October 1939. At that time she was transferred to Hawaii and based on Pearl Harbor.

Missing captain

In July 1941 Commander Thomas C. Latimore, Dobbins captain, disappeared while hiking the local Aiea Hills.  His body was never found and was the subject of much local news coverage and rumor before being overshadowed by the Pearl Harbor attack.  Commander Latimore was declared legally dead in July 1942.

Attack on Pearl Harbor

Dobbin was present during the attack on Pearl Harbor on 7 December 1941.

Dobbins crew watched as Japanese planes targeted Battleship Row, but as the battleships each took heavy damage the Japanese pilots looked for other targets.  Seeing that the ship had admiral flags, the aircraft tried to bomb Dobbin, but the ship only took shrapnel damage.

Dobbins small craft spent the morning picking up survivors and taking the wounded to shore.  The ship picked up hundreds of sailors from other ships, and when she left the harbor in search of the Japanese fleet, 200 men from  alone were aboard.

World War II
After the attack, Dobbin served in the Hawaiian area until May 1942 and then she was sent to Sydney, Australia. Dobbin was one of several Allied vessels located in Sydney Harbor during the Japanese midget submarine attack of 31 May 1942. On 25 June 1943 she was sent to Brisbane, Mackay, Townsville, and Cleveland Bay, Australia, before arriving at Milne Bay, New Guinea, 30 September 1943.  She stayed near New Guinea until 14 February 1945, at which point she moved to Subic Bay in the Philippines.  She served at Subic Bay from 24 February to 3 November 1945.

Fate
Dobbin returned to San Diego on 7 December 1945 and was decommissioned on 27 September 1946.  She was transferred to the Maritime Commission for disposal on 24 December 1946.

Awards
American Defense Service Medal with "FLEET" clasp
Asiatic–Pacific Campaign Medal with one battle star
World War II Victory Medal

References

World War II auxiliary ships of the United States
1921 ships
Dobbin-class destroyer tenders
Ships present during the attack on Pearl Harbor
Tenders of the United States Navy
Destroyer tenders of the United States